Price Ellison (October 6, 1852 – December 10, 1932) was an English-born blacksmith, farmer, rancher and political figure in British Columbia. He represented Yale-East from 1898 to 1903 and Okanagan from 1903 to 1916 as a Conservative in the Legislative Assembly of British Columbia.

He was born in Dunham, Cheshire, the son of James Ellison and Ellen Fearnaught, and was educated in Manchester. Ellison entered the blacksmith and hardware business. In 1873, he came to the United States, travelling from Boston to California. Ellison settled in Vernon, British Columbia in 1876. In 1884, he married Sophia Christine Johnson, the first school teacher in Vernon. After not meeting much success at mining, he again worked as a blacksmith for a time in Vernon. Ellison then purchased a farm, where he grew wheat and raised livestock. He served in the provincial cabinet as Chief Commissioner of Lands and Works and then as Minister of Finance and Agriculture. Ellison was defeated when he ran for re-election to the assembly in 1916. He died in Vernon at the age of 81.

Ellison Provincial Park was named in his honour.  In 1910, as Commissioner of Lands and Works, Ellison travelled with a group of surveyors who established the boundaries for Strathcona Provincial Park, the first provincial park in British Columbia.

References

External links 
 
 

1852 births
1932 deaths
British Columbia Conservative Party MLAs